A number of steamships have been named Brita.

, built by Neptung AG, Hamburg as Maid of Corfu, carried name Brita in the period 1930–45
, Built by Sunderland Shipbuilding Co Ltd, Sunderland as Odland. Carried name Brita from 1928 to 1940

Ship names